The 1986–87 FA Cup was the 106th season of the world's oldest football knockout competition, the FA Cup. The competition was won by Coventry City, who beat Tottenham Hotspur 3–2, after extra-time, in the final at Wembley Stadium. It was Tottenham's only defeat in eight finals up to that point. The tournament started in August 1986, with non-league teams competing in the qualifying rounds.

First round proper

Teams from the Football League Third and Fourth Division entered in this round plus Altrincham, Runcorn, Frickley Athletic and Telford United, were given byes. The first round of games were played over the weekend 15–16 November 1986, with the exception of the Bristol Rovers – Brentford game. Replays were played either in the midweek fixtures on 17th-18th or on 24th.

Second round proper

The second round of games were played over 6–7 December 1986, with replays being played on 9th–10th.

Third round proper

Teams from the Football League First and Second Division entered in this round. Most of the third round of games in the FA Cup were played over the weekend 10–11 January 1987. Various matches and replays were played as late as 31 January, however. Holders Liverpool were eliminated by Luton Town.

Fourth round proper

The fourth round of games were played mainly over the weekend 31 January – 1 February 1987. All other ties took place on 3–4 February.

Fifth round proper

The fifth set of games were played over the weekend 21–22 February 1987, with the first set of replays on 24th-25th.

Sixth round proper

The sixth round of FA Cup games were played over the weekend 14–15 March 1987. There were no replays.

Semi-finals

Seven time winners Tottenham Hotspur were drawn with 1984 finalists Watford for the Villa Park semi-final, which saw the North Londoners win 4-1 and reach their eighth final, having won all of their previous FA Cup finals.

Hillsborough was the venue for the other semi-final. Leeds United, managed by their former captain Billy Bremner, were pushing for promotion in the Second Division and making their first serious challenge for a major trophy in over 10 years. Their opponents were Coventry City, who had never reached an FA Cup semi-final before. In a closely fought game, Coventry won 3–2.

Final

After two minutes, Clive Allen scored his 49th goal of the season, heading past keeper Steve Ogrizovic at the near-post from a Chris Waddle cross. Within seven minutes though, Coventry were level through Dave Bennett, a Cup Final loser in 1981 for Manchester City at the hands of Spurs. Tottenham were back in front five minutes before the break through past defender Gary Mabbutt.

Midway through the second half Coventry were level again – Bennett's cross from the right was met by striker Keith Houchen with a diving header. The scores stayed level until full-time and the game went into extra time. Six minutes in, Mabbutt scored an own goal after Lloyd McGrath centred the ball and it took a deflection off of the Spurs defender's knee and over keeper Ray Clemence.

References

External links
The FA Cup at TheFA.com
FA Cup at BBC.co.uk
FA Cup news at Reuters.co.uk

 
FA Cup seasons
Fa Cup, 1986-87
1986–87 domestic association football cups